George Gee may refer to:

* George Gee (murderer) (1881–1904), Canadian murderer
 George Gee (bandleader), Chinese-American swing big-band leader
 George Gee (ice hockey) (1922–1972), Canadian professional ice hockey player
 George Gee (mayor), former mayor of Petone, the first Chinese-New Zealander mayor